Rocking the USA is the first White Lion live compilation album released in 2005, now better known as Tramp's White Lion or White Lion 2, with all new band members again but still features original lead singer Mike Tramp.

Background and recording
Following the release of five solo albums in the last seven years ending with the album Songs I Left Behind in 2004, Tramp continued with the reformation of White Lion. The album Last Roar which was also released in 2004 featured new re-recorded versions of White Lion classic tracks and with the new line up Tramp went on tour in 2005. The album was produced by legendary engineer and producer Michael Wagener, who also produced the bands studio albums "Pride" and "Big Game" and features the bands best live set.

All the songs on Rocking the USA are taken from the recent tour with the new line up and features all of White Lion's charted singles from their first four studio albums.

Release and promotion
The live versions of "Wait" and "When the Children Cry" were released as promo and later iTunes singles and were also released as bonus tracks on Return of the Pride in 2008.

A live music video was made for the song "Lights and Thunder" which features on the White Lion DVD Bang Your Head Festival 2005. 

In 2007, a single disc edition of the album was released under the title White Lion: Live Extended Versions.

Track listing

Disc 1
 "Lights and Thunder" - 7:18
 "Hungry" - 4:20
 "Lonely Nights" - 5:16
 "Love Don't Come Easy" - 4:57
 "Broken Heart" - 4:19
 "Fight to Survive" - 6:23
 "Cry for Freedom" - 5:45
 "You're All I Need" - 4:30
 "Little Fighter" - 5:25

Disc 2
 "It's Over" - 5:26
 "Living on the Edge" - 5:46
 "Tell Me" - 5:16
 "Wait" - 4:23
 "Lady of the Valley" - 7:47
 "When the Children Cry" - 5:30
 "Radar Love" - 12:22

Single disc edition (Extended Versions)
 "Hungry" - 4:20
 "Lady of the Valley" - 7:47
 "Broken Heart" - 4:19
 "Tell Me" - 5:16
 "When the Children Cry" - 5:30
 "You're All I Need" - 4:30
 "Living on the Edge" - 5:46
 "Radar Love" - 12:22
 "Little Fighter" - 5:25
 "Wait" - 4:23

Band members
 Mike Tramp - Vocals
 Jamie Law - Guitar
 Claus Langeskov - Bass
 Troy Patrick Farrell - Drums
 Hennig Wanner - Keyboards

Production
 Michael Wagener – producer
 Adam Logan – engineer

Bang Your Head Festival 2005 
Is a live DVD released by White Lion on December 5, 2008. The main feature is White Lion's return concert at the 2005 Bang Your Head Festival in Germany. The DVD also includes a full length interview with Mike Tramp, a slide show, and performances of songs from the USA tour. The DVD also features a live music video for the song "Lights and Thunder" showing the band rocking through the USA. 

All the songs on the DVD feature on the White Lion live album Rocking the USA.

DVD Track listing
 "Lights and Thunder"
 "Hungry"
 "Lonely Nights"
 "Broken Heart"
 "Fight to Survive"
 "Little Fighter"
 "Living on the Edge"
 "Tell Me"
 "Wait"
 "Radar Love"
 "Lady of the Valley" (Slide show)
 "Lights and Thunder" (Live video from the USA tour)
 "It's Over" (Live in the USA)

CD Track listing
In 2009 a Live cd version of the DVD was released titled White Lion Live.
 "Wait"
 "Little Fighter"
 "Tell Me"
 "Radar Love"
 "Hungry"
 "Broken Heart"
 "Fight to Survive"
 "Lights and Thunder"
 "Living on the Edge"
 "Lonely Nights"

References

White Lion albums
2005 compilation albums
2005 live albums
Frontiers Records live albums
Albums produced by Michael Wagener